Mount Chersky is a mountain in the Baikal Range, Russian Federation. 

This peak is named after Polish explorer Jan Czerski (1845 - 1892, Ivan Chersky transcribed from Russian), who greatly contributed to the study of Lake Baikal.

Geography
It is an ultra-prominent peak, located near Lake Baikal, in the border of Irkutsk Oblast and Buryatia.

See also
List of mountains and hills of Russia
List of ultras of Northeast Asia

References

Chersky
Chersky
Chersky